The 1997–98 Radford Highlanders men's basketball team represented Radford University during the 1997–98 NCAA Division I men's basketball season. The Highlanders, led by second-year head coach Ron Bradley, played their home games at the Dedmon Center in Radford, Virginia as members of the Big South Conference. They finished the season 20–10, 10–2 in Big South play to finish in second place. They defeated Charleston Southern, UMBC, and UNC Asheville to become champions of the Big South tournament. The received the Big South's automatic bid to the NCAA tournament  the first appearance in program history  where they were defeated in the first round by No. 1 seed Duke.

Roster 

Source

Schedule and results

|-
!colspan=9 style=| Regular season

|-
!colspan=9 style=| Big South tournament

|-
!colspan=9 style=| NCAA tournament

References 

Radford Highlanders men's basketball seasons
Radford
Radford
Radford
Radford